Parayancheri is a small town in the easternmost part of Calicut city (also known as Kozhikode City) in the Indian state of Kerala.

Transport 

 Railway station - Kozhikode Railway Station, 2.09 km
 Airport - Calicut International Airport, 21.50 km
 Port - Beypore Port
 Indira Gandhi Mofussil Bus Station - Kozhikode
 Palayam Bus Station - Kozhikode
 K.S.R.T.C Bus Station - Mavoor Road, Kozhikode

Education 
 Government Boys Higher Secondary School
 Government Vocational Higher Secondary School
 Government Girls’ Higher Secondary School
 G.L.P.S
 Hill Top Public School

Notable residents 

 S. K. Pottekkatt - teacher, novelist, travelogue writer, member of Indian parliament
 Thikkodiyan - poet, novelist, producer at All India Radio

Suburbs of Kozhikode